Alexander McAlpine Spark (born 16 October 1949) was a Scottish professional footballer, who played as a central defender for Preston North End, Motherwell and Bradford City.

References

1949 births
Living people
Preston North End F.C. players
Bradford City A.F.C. players
Motherwell F.C. players
Scottish footballers
People from Stenhousemuir
English Football League players
Footballers from Falkirk (council area)
Association football defenders